Marta Kutas (born September 2, 1949) is a Professor and Chair of cognitive science and an adjunct professor of neuroscience at the University of California, San Diego.  She also directs the Center for Research in Language at UCSD.  Kutas is known for discovering the N400, an event-related potential (ERP) component typically elicited by unexpected linguistic stimuli, with her colleague Steven Hillyard in one of the first studies in what is now the field of neurolinguistics.

Kutas received a B.A. in 1971 from Oberlin College and a Ph.D. in 1977 from the University of Illinois, Urbana-Champaign, and she completed a postdoctoral fellowship at the University of California, San Diego in 1980.  She then accepted a position as a research neuroscientist in the Department of Neurosciences at UCSD, and she has been a member of the Department of Cognitive Science at UCSD since its founding in 1988. In 2018 Kutas was elected to the American Academy of Arts and Sciences.

External links
Marta Kutas' Homepage
CV
Kutas Cognitive Electrophysiology Lab

American cognitive neuroscientists
American women neuroscientists
Psycholinguists
Oberlin College alumni
University of Illinois alumni
University of California, San Diego faculty
1949 births
Living people
21st-century American women scientists